Elroy van der Hooft (born April 20, 1990, in Zeven, Germany) is a Dutch footballer who plays for Chigatoy FC.

Career

Sealing a move to AO Chania of the Greek third level in 2011, his first professional experience, van der Hooft was not paid there, however, leaving after six months.

Moving to Persekap Pasuruan of the Indonesian second division in 2013, van der Hooft registered too late so he penned a three-month contract with Phnom Penh Crown of the Cambodian League instead, wearing the number 49 and authoring a hat-trick on his debut in a 3-1 win over Kirivong Sok Sen Chey. He was also the highest paid player in Cambodia at the time and was sometimes referred to as the "Cristiano Ronaldo of Cambodia". However, after his spell with Phnom Penh Crown, van der Hooft became an incorrigible drug and gambling addict, constantly inebriated as well.
Then, for driving a hacker who was wanted by the police and other offenses, he was arrested and jailed for 70 days.
Upon release in 2017, the Dutch midfielder returned to former youth team VV UDO.

Tried out for Indonesian side Gresik United in late 2012.

References

External links 
 at Footballdatabase.eu

1990 births
Living people
Dutch expatriate sportspeople in Indonesia
Expatriate footballers in Indonesia
Phnom Penh Crown FC players
Expatriate footballers in Greece
Dutch people of Indonesian descent
Association football forwards
Dutch expatriate footballers
Expatriate footballers in Cambodia
Dutch footballers
Footballers from Lower Saxony
People from Rotenburg (district)
Angkor Tiger FC players